Raymond Garramone (August 13, 1926 – June 16, 1998) was an American Democratic Party politician who served in the New Jersey State Senate from 1974 to 1978. An engineer and businessman, he served as Mayor of Haworth, New Jersey and was elected State Senator in 1973 from the 39th Legislative District, defeating Republican ex-Assemblyman Harry Randall, Jr. by 5,057 votes. He did not seek re-election to a second term in the Senate in 1977, but instead challenged incumbent Governor Brendan Byrne in the Democratic primary for Governor of New Jersey.   He finished sixth in the primary with 6,602 votes (1%).

References

1926 births
1998 deaths
Mayors of places in New Jersey
Democratic Party New Jersey state senators
People from Haworth, New Jersey
20th-century American politicians